Nickson Clement Kibabage (born 12 October 2000) is a Tanzanian international footballer.

Career statistics

International

References

2000 births
Living people
Tanzanian footballers
Tanzanian expatriate footballers
Tanzania international footballers
Association football forwards
Mtibwa Sugar F.C. players
Difaâ Hassani El Jadidi players
Expatriate footballers in Morocco
Tanzanian expatriate sportspeople in Morocco
Tanzanian Premier League players